Aldie Mill is a water mill in Aldie, Virginia built shortly after 1804 to grind grain using the waters of the Little River. Retaining much of its original machinery, it is one of the best-preserved mills in Virginia.

History
Charles F. Mercer, a lawyer, Virginia legislator and military officer, obtained the right to dam the Little River and to build a mill in 1804. He built a house for himself across the Little River Turnpike, calling the complex "Aldie Manor," after Mercer's supposed ancestors' Aldie Castle in Scotland. The village that grew around the complex was named Aldie in 1810. Mercer's father, James Mercer, had operated a tub mill at the location from about 1764. The new mill was built between 1807 and 1809 by William Cooke, who worked for Mercer under an indenture contract. Cooke built the mill, granary miller's house and store, as well as the now-disappeared distillery, blacksmith shop, sawmill, cooperage and wheelwright's shops, in return for a half-share in the mill operation.  The original mill machinery was a system patented and manufactured by Oliver Evans. Much of the machinery, along with the original wood water wheels, was replaced at the beginning of the twentieth century.  Mercer bought Cooke's share in the operation for $11,250 in 1816, leasing the mill to tenant operators. Mercer sold the mill in 1835 to John Moore, whose descendants operated the mill until 1971, through six generations.

Description
The mill features two overshot water wheels arranged one after the other powering the milling machinery in the brick mill building. The main portion of the mill is two stories, with two loft levels under the roof.  It is flanked by a one-story section on the east and a two-story portion to the west. The village of Aldie grew up around the mill following its construction.

The historic district surrounding the mill includes two houses, the Mercer House and the Miller's House.  The Mercer House overlooks the mill. It is a two-story Federal style house, covered in stucco and altered over time. The Miller's House, a two-story brick structure, is located behind the mill between the Little River and the millrace. The Miller's House has been expanded to the rear. Other buildings in the complex include a granary dating to the period 1809–1816 and a smaller "county mill" structure, used to make plaster.

Park
The complex is part of the Aldie Mill Historic Park, operated by the Northern Virginia Regional Park Authority, and is open to the public. The metal millwheels have been restored and operate the mill's machinery.  It was placed on the National Register of Historic Places on September 15, 1970.

References

External links

 Aldie Mill Historic Park
 Aldie Mill Historic District at the Journey Through Hallowed Ground

Grinding mills on the National Register of Historic Places in Virginia
National Register of Historic Places in Loudoun County, Virginia
Historic districts in Loudoun County, Virginia
Journey Through Hallowed Ground National Heritage Area
Grinding mills in Virginia
Mill museums in Virginia
Museums in Loudoun County, Virginia
Parks in Loudoun County, Virginia
Watermills in the United States
Historic districts on the National Register of Historic Places in Virginia